Timeline of K-pop at Billboard in the 2020s is a history of K-pop as recorded by Billboard, Billboard charts, and Billboard K-Town, an online magazine column, presented by Billboard on its Billboard.com site, that reports on K-pop music; artists, concerts, chart information and news events. It is preceded by earlier history at Timeline of K-pop at Billboard.

Legend

2020
Red lettering for Type codes denotes events affected by the COVID-19 pandemic

See also
 Timeline of K-pop at Billboard
 List of K-pop on the Billboard charts
 List of K-pop albums on the Billboard charts
 List of K-pop songs on the Billboard charts
 List of K-pop on the Billboard year-end charts
 Korea K-Pop Hot 100
 List of K-Pop concerts held outside Asia
 List of K-pop artists
 List of South Korean idol groups

References

External links
Billboard 1920 to 2016, American Radio Archives

Timelines of music
K-pop
Billboard (magazine)
K-pop timeline
Kpop